Jean-Pierre Schumacher (15 February 1924 – 21 November 2021) was a French Trappist monk.

Biography 
Schumacher was born on 15 February 1924 in Buding, Moselle. He was born and raised in a Catholic family of six children. At the age of eighteen he was enlisted in the Wehrmacht and escaped being sent to the Russian front thanks to a false diagnosis of tuberculosis during the military medical examination. Schumacher studied with the Marist Fathers and was ordained a priest in 1953. In 1957, he joined the trappists and entered the Abbey of the Notre-Dame de Timadeuc. At the request of the Roman Catholic Archdiocese of Algiers, Schumacher was sent in 1964 to Tibhirine, Algeria alongside three other monks from Timadeuc.

On 21 May 1996, Schumacher survived the Tibhirine massacre alongside Father Amédée. The monastery was transferred to Fez where he was immediately appointed "superior ad nutum". On 18 September 1997, he became the successor of Christian de Chergé by election. Four years later, in 2000, they settled permanently in Midelt in a monastery previously occupied by Franciscans. Since then, the community has eight members of very diverse origins. In 2019, Schumacher met Pope Francis, in which Pope Francis kissed his hands at a meeting, while he was visiting Morocco.

Schumacher died on 21 November 2021 in Midelt, at the age of 97.

In popular culture 
Schumacher was portrayed by actor Loïc Pichon in the 2010 drama film Of Gods and Men.

References 

1924 births
2021 deaths
Trappists
20th-century monks
Disease-related deaths in Morocco
French monks
People from Moselle (department)